The ECW World Heavyweight Championship was a professional wrestling world heavyweight championship originally used in Extreme Championship Wrestling (ECW) and later, World Wrestling Entertainment (WWE). It was the original world title of the ECW promotion, spun off from the NWA World Heavyweight Championship. It was established under ECW in 1994 but was originally introduced in 1992 by the promotion's precursor, Eastern Championship Wrestling. The inaugural champion was Jimmy Snuka, however, WWE considers the inaugural champion to be Shane Douglas, with his reign beginning on August 27, 1994. 

The title was deactivated in 2001 when ECW went out of business. ECW was then purchased by WWE two years later during the summer of 2003. In 2006, WWE reactivated the championship as the world title of their newly established ECW brand. It was the third concurrently active world championship in the promotion, complementing the WWE Championship and World Heavyweight Championship of the other two brands, Raw and SmackDown. The ECW Championship briefly appeared as the sole world title of the Raw brand in 2008 as a result of that year's draft. When WWE disbanded the ECW brand in 2010, the championship was subsequently retired with Ezekiel Jackson as the final titleholder.

History

Origin

The ECW World Heavyweight Championship was introduced originally in 1992 as the NWA-ECW Heavyweight Championship with Jimmy Snuka becoming the inaugural champion on April 25. However, its origin is attributed to events that began in the National Wrestling Alliance (NWA), an organization with many members promotions. In the early 1990s, Eastern Championship Wrestling (ECW) was a member of the NWA and by 1994, the NWA World Heavyweight Championship, the world title of the NWA, was vacant. Consequently, a tournament was organized to crown a new NWA World Heavyweight Champion and on August 27, NWA-ECW Heavyweight Champion Shane Douglas defeated 2 Cold Scorpio in the finals to win the title. However, Douglas immediately relinquished the NWA World Heavyweight Championship and instead proclaimed himself the new ECW World Heavyweight Champion. ECW subsequently seceded from the NWA and became Extreme Championship Wrestling (ECW). The ECW World Heavyweight Championship was thus established, spun off from the NWA title. It remained active until April 11, 2001, when ECW closed and World Wrestling Entertainment subsequently purchased its assets. The final champion Rhyno went on to win the NWA World Heavyweight Championship in 2005.

Recommission
By 2005, WWE began reintroducing ECW through content from the ECW video library and a series of books, which included the release of The Rise and Fall of ECW documentary. With heightened and rejuvenated interest in the ECW franchise, WWE organized ECW One Night Stand on June 12, a reunion event that featured ECW alumni. Due to the financial and critical success of the production, WWE produced the second ECW One Night Stand on June 11, 2006, which served as the premiere event in the relaunch of the ECW franchise as a third WWE brand, complementary to Raw and SmackDown. On June 13, Paul Heyman, former ECW owner and newly appointed figurehead for the ECW brand, recommissioned the ECW World Heavyweight Championship to be the brand's world title and awarded it to Rob Van Dam as a result of winning the WWE Championship at One Night Stand 2006. Heyman had originally stated that either the WWE Championship or the World Heavyweight Championship would "become" the ECW World Heavyweight Championship if a competitor designated to the ECW brand became WWE Champion or World Heavyweight Champion at the event. However, Rob Van Dam later declared that he would hold both titles simultaneously instead. The title became known as the ECW World Championship in June 2006, and later simply as the ECW Championship in August 2007.

ECW World Championship Tournament (2007)
The ECW World Championship Tournament was a tournament created to determine a new ECW World Champion after Bobby Lashley vacated his championship due to being drafted to Raw on June 11, 2007. The finals took place at Vengeance: Night of Champions. This tournament is notable because one of the semi-final rounds was Chris Benoit's final match. The tournament final was supposed to be Benoit vs CM Punk but Benoit no-showed the event and was replaced by Johnny Nitro, who would go on to win the title. It was reported the day after the event that Benoit, his wife Nancy, and their son Daniel were found dead in their home in suburban Atlanta. The day after police ruled that Benoit himself had killed his wife and son before committing suicide. This event has gone on to be known as the Chris Benoit double murder and suicide.

(*) – Johnny Nitro was an event-day replacement added by WWE after Chris Benoit was a no-show, with the official statement a "family emergency".  It was later discovered Benoit's double murder/suicide had taken place that weekend.

Brand designation
Following the events of the WWE brand extension, an annual WWE draft was established, in which select members of the WWE roster are reassigned to a different brand. ECW was revived as a third brand in 2006 to rival Raw and SmackDown and continued to operate until February 16, 2010, rendering the title inactive once again.

Championship belt designs

The original belt was a five-plate title belt made by Mike Vartanian. The belt was an exact copy of NWA-ECW's forerunner Tri-State Wrestling Alliance's Heavyweight title. The only difference was that the NWA-ECW's main plate featured the promotion’s name and had areas painted blue. During this belt's period of use, it was treated badly and was grinded, repainted, and had jewels placed on the main plate, which would explain why it appears different in almost every photo of it. By the time the belt was replaced, it was in a very bad state and two of the side plates were broken off or missing.

When Eastern Championship Wrestling withdrew from the NWA to become Extreme Championship Wrestling in 1994 it continued using this belt until 1996 when it had a new belt created in 1996 starting during Raven's second title reign and was used through 1998.

In 1998, ECW had a new belt created for its championship that would be used until the promotion ceased operations in 2001.

Soon after its recommissioning, the ECW World Heavyweight Championship belt design was updated to a design similar to the belt used before ECW's original closure in 2001, which featured a black leather strap with a snakeskin pattern on the rear, snaps to wrap around the waist of the wrestler who wore it, and five pieces made of gold. In the middle of the strap was a large centerpiece, which featured a design of a blue globe in the center, and to the left and right of the globe were a pair of baseball bats wrapped in barbed wire. At the top of the piece, a purple ECW logo and the words "World Heavyweight Wrestling Champion" were engraved with the words "Heavyweight Wrestling" in red, which gave the text a blood-like appearance. In addition, the entire piece was engraved with a pattern similar to that of a steel cage. Along the strap, on both ends, were four smaller pieces that featured a design similar to that of the centerpiece. The new belt as of June 20, 2006 was differentiated by a full black strap with barbed wire tooling, red ECW logos, and the innards of the steel cage pattern outlined in black.

On July 22, 2008, ECW General Manager Theodore Long introduced a new belt design for the ECW Championship belt. This design features a large black leather strap with five platinum pieces. The large centerpiece features a design of a phoenix over a globe in the center with its wings expanded and rays of light emitting from it. At the top of the piece, the WWE logo and the words "World Wrestling Entertainment" are engraved with "ECW" in large letters engraved prominently over the phoenix. A nameplate, which has the name of the champion etched, is located below it and at the bottom of the piece, the word "Champion" is engraved. Additionally, the entire piece is bordered by a jagged saw-like pattern. Along the strap, on both ends, are four small biker cross-shape pieces that feature a design similar to that of the centerpiece.

Reigns

Overall, there have been 49 ECW World Heavyweight Championship reigns shared among 32 individuals. The inaugural champion was Jimmy Snuka, who won the title by defeating Salvatore Bellomo in April 1992. The Sandman holds the most reigns as champion, with five. Shane Douglas, in his fourth reign, had the longest reign in the title's history which lasted 406 days. Ezekiel Jackson's 3-minute reign following his defeat of Christian on the television finale of ECW is the shortest, as the title was retired with the cancellation of the ECW brand. Christian's second reign was the longest under WWE at 205 days.

See also
List of former championships in WWE
World championships in WWE

Notes

References

External links
The ECW Championship at WWE.com
Wrestling-Titles.com

Extreme Championship Wrestling championships
World heavyweight wrestling championships
Championships acquired by WWE
ECW (WWE brand)